Hochstetter Peak is the partly ice-free bluff rising to 1087 m in the southeast foothills of Louis-Philippe Plateau on Trinity Peninsula in Graham Land, Antarctica.  It is surmounting Cugnot Ice Piedmont to the east and south.

The peak is named after the German-Austrian geologist Ferdinand von Hochstetter (1829-1884) who worked in Bulgaria, other European countries and New Zealand.

Location
German-British mapping in 1996.

Maps
 Trinity Peninsula. Scale 1:250000 topographic map No. 5697. Institut für Angewandte Geodäsie and British Antarctic Survey, 1996.
 Antarctic Digital Database (ADD). Scale 1:250000 topographic map of Antarctica. Scientific Committee on Antarctic Research (SCAR). Since 1993, regularly updated.

Notes

References
 Hochstetter Peak. SCAR Composite Gazetteer of Antarctica.
 Bulgarian Antarctic Gazetteer. Antarctic Place-names Commission. (details in Bulgarian, basic data in English)

External links
 Hochstetter Peak. Adjusted Copernix satellite image

Mountains of Trinity Peninsula
Bulgaria and the Antarctic